Tomasz Nikodem Hajto (born 16 October 1972) is a Polish expert commentator, sports agent, football coach and retired professional footballer.

Club career

Born in Maków Podhalański, Hajto began his career playing for local club Halniak Maków Podhalański. He moved to Góral Żywiec before making his big break in 1991 with Hutnik Kraków. His prowess as a youngster was noticed by many, and in 1993–94 he was transferred to Górnik Zabrze.

Hajto was soon to create interest from other countries, most particularly Germany and England, but it was to the former that he was first transferred. He first played for MSV Duisburg for two seasons. After the team was relegated to 2. Bundesliga, Hajto was transferred to FC Schalke 04, where he played until 2004. He then signed a two-year contract with 1. FC Nürnberg. As he had not met the expectations, he was transferred to Southampton in summer 2005. In January 2006, his contract with Southampton was cancelled, enabling him to sign for Derby County on an eighteen-month contract, however this deal was also terminated early, after only four months at the club.

International career
Hajto participated in the 2002 FIFA World Cup, where he played two matches against South Korea and Portugal. He has scored six goals in 62 caps for Poland.

Personal life
Hajto is married to a former Polish sprinter Renata Sosin (pl), with whom he has two children: son, Mateusz, and daughter, Wiktoria.

In January 2008, Hajto was found guilty of manslaughter after speeding in his car and killing a female pedestrian at a crossing in Łódź. Pleading guilty to the charges, he was given a suspended two-year jail sentence, ordered to pay a fine of 7,000 Polish złotys and given a one-year driving ban. He had earlier been fined in 2004 for dealing in smuggled cigarettes.

Career statistics

International goals

Honours
Schalke 04
UEFA Intertoto Cup: 2003

References

External links
 
 

1. FC Nürnberg players
I liga players
1972 births
2002 FIFA World Cup players
21st-century Polish criminals
Association football agents
Association football central defenders
Association football commentators
Association football fullbacks
Association football player-managers
Bundesliga players
Color commentators
Derby County F.C. players
Ekstraklasa players
English Football League players
Expatriate footballers in Germany
FC Schalke 04 players
GKS Tychy managers
Górnik Zabrze players
Hutnik Nowa Huta players
Jagiellonia Białystok managers
Living people
ŁKS Łódź players
MSV Duisburg players
People from Maków Podhalański
Poland international footballers
Polish football managers
Polish footballers
Polish people convicted of manslaughter
Southampton F.C. players
Sportspeople from Lesser Poland Voivodeship